There are at least 12 named lakes and reservoirs in Izard County, Arkansas.

Lakes
	Dot Hole, el.

Reservoirs
	Bass Lake, el.  
	Cedar Glade Lake, el.  
	Crown Lake, el.  
	Crutchfield Lake, el.  
	Diamong Lake, el.  
	Gillihan Lake, el.  
	Lake Pioneer, el.  
	Lodge Lake, el.  
	North Lake, el.  
	Spiritual Development Lake, el.  
	White Oak Lake, el.

See also

 List of lakes in Arkansas

Notes

Bodies of water of Izard County, Arkansas
Izard